Jean-Claude Servan-Schreiber (11 April 1918 – 11 April 2018) was a French politician and journalist. He served as a member of the National Assembly from 1965 to 1967, representing Seine. He was a member of the Union for the New Republic, a center-right political party. He died in Paris on 11 April 2018, his 100th birthday.

References

1918 births
2018 deaths
Politicians from Paris
Union for the New Republic politicians
Deputies of the 2nd National Assembly of the French Fifth Republic
French journalists
Writers from Paris
French centenarians
Men centenarians